Yakupovo (Yaqup) is a rural locality (a village) in Matveyevsky Selsoviet, Kushnarenkovsky District, Bashkortostan, Russia. The population was 130 as of 2010. There are 3 streets.

Geography 
Yakupovo is located 14 km northwest of Kushnarenkovo (the district's administrative centre) by road. Matveyevo is the nearest rural locality.

References 

Rural localities in Kushnarenkovsky District